Robert Kieran Dennis Hall (born 20 October 1993) is an English professional footballer who plays for Barnet. Hall plays as a forward or on the wing, During his time as a young player at West Ham, Hall spent time on loan at Oxford, Milton Keynes Dons, Birmingham City and Bolton Wanderers before finally signing for Bolton on a permanent basis.

Club career

West Ham United
Hall began his career with West Ham United in 2001 and signed his first professional contract in October 2010. Hall was given squad number 46 for the 2011–12 season and was an unused substitute for West Ham's League Cup defeat by Aldershot Town in August 2011.

Oxford United (loan)
In September he signed a one-month loan deal with Oxford United, later extended by a further month. He made his debut on 13 September against Dagenham & Redbridge, scoring the only goal in a 1–0 victory, the first of six goals in his ten appearances in all competitions. West Ham recalled Hall on 31 October as cover for injured players. He did not, however, feature for them and returned to Oxford on a one-month loan on 16 November. Hall played four games for Oxford during his second loan spell, without scoring, before being recalled by West Ham on 21 December. He made his West Ham debut on 31 December in a 2–1 away defeat to Derby County, coming on in the 79th minute as a substitute for Papa Bouba Diop.

Milton Keynes Dons (loan)
In March 2012 Hall signed on loan for League One club Milton Keynes Dons until the end of the 2011–12 season. He was West Ham's Academy Player of the Season for 2011–12.

Hall played once for West Ham in the Premier League and twice in the League Cup in the 2012–13 season before joining Championship club Birmingham City on loan in November.

Birmingham City (loan)
Hall made his Birmingham debut away at Derby County. After an hour, he made a pacy run down the centre and was fouled as he entered the penalty area. Marlon King converted the penalty for Birmingham's equaliser, but they lost 3–2. He provided the assists for both of Curtis Davies's goals in the 2–1 defeat of Barnsley in December. West Ham declined to allow Hall to play for Birmingham in the FA Cup, but were prepared to extend his loan for a further month, to be reviewed on a monthly basis. He made seven assists from thirteen Championship appearances before returning to West Ham for assessment of a groin problem, and underwent surgery on a hernia a few days before his loan formally ended on 16 March.

Bolton Wanderers
On 28 March 2013, he was loaned out by West Ham again, this time for a month initially to link up with Bolton Wanderers. He made only one appearance, starting against Blackpool in a 2–2 draw on the last day of the season. He started the game but was replaced by substitute Marvin Sordell after 37 minutes when Bolton were 2–0 down.

Following his contract at West Ham expiring, Hall signed for Bolton permanently on 1 July 2013, signing a three-year contract. In August 2013, the Professional Football Compensation Committee set Hall's transfer fee as an initial £450,000 with additional fees payable upon certain conditions occurring. West Ham would also be due 20% of any profit made by Bolton should Hall be transferred. He made his second début on 6 August as he started in Bolton's 3–1 League Cup away win against Shrewsbury Town. He scored the first goal of the game, his first for Bolton.

At the end of the 2015–16 season, the club confirmed that he would be leaving when his contract expired at the end of June, following a knee injury sustained while on loan at MK Dons.

Milton Keynes Dons (loan)
On 26 March 2015, Hall re-joined Milton Keynes Dons on-loan until the end of the 2014–15 season. On 18 April 2015, Hall scored his first goals for Milton Keynes Dons with a hat-trick in a 6–1 home defeat of Leyton Orient. He dedicated the goals to his friend and former teammate at West Ham United, Dylan Tombides, who died exactly one year previous from cancer.

On 28 July 2015, Hall signed for a second consecutive loan period until the end of the 2015–16 season. On 5 April 2016 Hall suffered a ruptured anterior cruciate ligament in his left knee during training, and returned to Bolton Wanderers for treatment.

Oxford United
On 19 July 2016, Oxford United announced that they had signed the former loanee on a two-year permanent deal, despite his ongoing injury. He made his first appearance as a substitute in a Football League Trophy match against Chelsea U23 on 8 November, and his first league appearance, again as a substitute, against Shrewsbury Town four days later. His first starting appearance came in a League One fixture against Coventry City on 19 November. In his first season back at the club, he scored 6 goals in 26 League appearances (5 as substitute) and appeared at Wembley in the 2017 EFL Trophy Final. After a bright start to 2017–18, in which he scored a further 5 goals in 15 appearances (two in the league), he spent four months out of contention due to a long-term injury, before returning to the first team for the final two games of the season. His 2018–19 season was even worse hit by injury: after playing in the opening fixture, he sustained a knee injury that required an operation and did not reappear until the last four games of the season. However, he signed a new one-year contract with Oxford in May 2019, with the option of a further year. This option was taken up before Hall was released at the end of the 2020-21 season.

Forest Green Rovers (loan)

After signing a one-year contract extension with Oxford, Hall joined League Two club Forest Green Rovers on a six-month loan on 24 January 2020.

Barnet
Following his release by Oxford, Hall went on trial at Gillingham in pre-season. He signed for Barnet on 21 September 2021.

International career
Hall has represented England at under-16, under-17, under-18 and under-19 levels and was a member of the team that won the 2010 UEFA European Under-17 Football Championship in Liechtenstein. His under-19 debut came on 10 November 2011 when he appeared as a substitute for Harry Kane and scored the only goal in a victory against Denmark under-19 at Falmer Stadium.

Personal life
Hall attended The Grange School, Aylesbury. His cousin is fellow footballer Reece Hall-Johnson who plays for Wrexham.

Career statistics

Honours
Milton Keynes Dons
Football League One runner-up: 2014–15
Oxford United
Football League Trophy runner-up: 2016–17

England U17
UEFA European Under-17 Championship: 2010

References

External links
 

1993 births
Living people
Sportspeople from Aylesbury
English footballers
England youth international footballers
Association football forwards
West Ham United F.C. players
Oxford United F.C. players
Milton Keynes Dons F.C. players
Birmingham City F.C. players
Bolton Wanderers F.C. players
Forest Green Rovers F.C. players
Barnet F.C. players
English Football League players
National League (English football) players 
Premier League players
Black British sportsmen
Footballers from Buckinghamshire